Breaks Interstate Park is a bi-state state park located partly in southeastern Kentucky and mostly in southwestern Virginia, in the Jefferson National Forest, at the northeastern terminus of Pine Mountain. Rather than their respective state park systems, it is instead administered by an interstate compact between the states of Virginia and Kentucky. It is one of several interstate parks in the United States, but only one of two operated jointly under a compact rather than as two separate state park units. The Virginia Department of Conservation and Recreation and the Kentucky Department of Parks are still major partner organizations.

The Breaks is also referred as the "Grand Canyon of the South", through which the Russell Fork river and Clinchfield Railroad (now the CSX Transportation Kingsport Subdivision) run. It is accessed via highway 80 (Virginia 80 and Kentucky 80), between Haysi, Virginia, and Elkhorn City, Kentucky, and passes through the community of Breaks, Virginia, east of the park.

History
This area was previously covered by a vast inland sea around 180 million years ago. Over subsequent millennia, the Russel Fork gradually carved through the rock to form the spectacular valleys. Early human activity saw the area serve as hunting grounds for Shawnee and Cherokee people. In 1767, American frontiersman Daniel Boone passed through the area looking for an easier westward passage through Pine Mountain. Boone subsequently gave the area its current name, The Breaks.

Preparations have been made to provide elk viewing areas. Elk were seen near the park in 2023 for the first time since the 1800s.

Geography
The canyon was formed by the Russell Fork river through millions of years of erosion.

Climate
The climate in this area is characterized by hot, humid summers and generally mild to cool winters.  According to the Köppen Climate Classification system, nearby Elkhorn City has a humid subtropical climate, abbreviated "Cfa" on climate maps.

Activities
The park has trails for hiking [], mountain biking [], and horseback riding. The park has a water park with five waterslides, a current channel, and splash pad for small children, in the summer of 2014 the park also added a regulation sized volleyball court. The park also offers fishing, paddle boating, canoeing, and hydro biking on Laurel Lake, and white-water rafting on the Russell Fork. The Breaks offers world-class rock climbing with sandstone similar to the nearby New River Gorge. The park offers a lodge with 82 guest rooms, four cottages near Beaver Pond, five cabins overlooking Laurel Lake, and a 122-site campground and a group camping area with 16 sites. The park has a visitor center with exhibits on the area's historical and natural features, a  conference center with restaurant, and an amphitheater.

Gallery

References

External links

Breaks Interstate Park Breaks Interstate Park Commission
Breaks Interstate Park Kentucky Department of Parks

Canyons and gorges of Virginia
Canyons and gorges of Kentucky
State parks of Kentucky
State parks of Virginia
Parks in Dickenson County, Virginia
Protected areas of Pike County, Kentucky
Protected areas established in 1954
1954 establishments in Virginia
1954 establishments in Kentucky
George Washington and Jefferson National Forests
Landforms of Pike County, Kentucky
Landforms of Dickenson County, Virginia
Transboundary protected areas